The 2019 Denver mayoral election was the 2019 edition of the quadrennial elections held to determine the Mayor of the City of Denver, Colorado. The election was held on May 7, 2019. Since no candidate received a majority of votes, a runoff election was held on June 4, 2019 between the two candidates with the most votes, incumbent Mayor Michael Hancock and Jamie Giellis. Hancock defeated Giellis in the runoff election, winning a third term as Mayor, and becoming the first mayor to be reelected to a third term since Wellington Webb in 1999. Hancock's third inauguration was held on July 15, 2019.

The election was officially nonpartisan, with its winner being elected to a four-year term. The elections were part of the 2019 Denver elections, which included elections for City Council and city Clerk and Recorder.

Candidates
The filing deadline is April 22, 2019.

Declared
 Lisa Calderón, professor of criminal justice and sociology at Regis University
 Stephan Evans
 Paul Fiorino, (Write-In)
 Marcus Giavanni, (Write-In) social media consultant, blockchain developer and musician; finished second in the 2015 mayoral election
 Jamie Giellis, consultant and former president of Denver's River North Art District
 Michael Hancock, incumbent Mayor of Denver
 Kalyn Heffernan, disability rights activist
 Leatha Scott, (Write-In) maintenance support clerk for United States Postal Service
 Ken Simpson, (Write-In) technology consultant
 Penfield Tate III, former state legislator and candidate for Mayor of Denver in 2003

Withdrew
 Kayvan Khalatbari, entrepreneur and Indian activist

Endorsements

Fundraising

Results

References

Mayoral elections in Denver
Denver
Denver mayoral